Shirley MacLaine (born Shirley MacLean Beaty, April 24, 1934) is an American actress, author, and former dancer. Known for her portrayals of quirky, strong-willed and eccentric women, MacLaine has received numerous accolades over her seven-decade career, including an Academy Award, an Emmy Award, two British Academy Film Awards, six Golden Globe Awards, two Volpi Cups and two Silver Bears. She has been honored with a Gala Tribute from the Film Society of Lincoln Center in 1995, the Golden Globe Cecil B. DeMille Award in 1998, the AFI Life Achievement Award in 2012, and the Kennedy Center Honor in 2013. MacLaine is one of the last remaining stars from the Golden Age of Hollywood.

Born in Richmond, Virginia, MacLaine made her acting debut as a teenager with minor roles in the Broadway musicals Oklahoma! and The Pajama Game. Following minor appearances as an understudy in various other productions, MacLaine made her film debut with Alfred Hitchcock's black comedy The Trouble with Harry (1955), winning the Golden Globe Award for New Star of the Year – Actress. She rose to prominence with starring roles in Around the World in 80 Days (1956), Some Came Running (1958), Ask Any Girl (1959), The Apartment (1960), The Children's Hour (1961), Irma la Douce (1963), Sweet Charity (1969), and Being There (1979). 

A six-time Academy Award nominee, MacLaine won the Academy Award for Best Actress for the James L. Brooks comedy drama Terms of Endearment (1983). Her other prominent films include The Turning Point (1977), Madame Sousatzka (1988), Steel Magnolias (1989), Postcards from the Edge (1990), In Her Shoes (2005), Bernie (2011), The Secret Life of Walter Mitty (2013), and Elsa & Fred (2014). 

She portrayed Coco Chanel in the television film, Coco Chanel (2008), receiving nominations for a Primetime Emmy Award, a Screen Actors Guild Award, and a Golden Globe Award. She also made appearances in various television series including Glee, Downton Abbey and Only Murders in the Building. Apart from acting, MacLaine has written numerous books regarding the subjects of metaphysics, spirituality, and reincarnation, as well as a best-selling memoir, Out on a Limb (1983).

Early life
Named after actress Shirley Temple (who was six years old at the time), Shirley MacLean Beaty was born on April 24, 1934, in Richmond, Virginia. Her father, Ira Owens Beaty, was a professor of psychology, public school administrator, and a real estate agent. Her mother, Kathlyn Corinne (née MacLean), was a drama teacher, originally from Wolfville, Nova Scotia, Canada. MacLaine's younger brother is the actor, writer, and director Warren Beatty; he changed the spelling of his surname when he became an actor. Their parents raised them as Baptists. Her uncle (her mother's brother-in-law) was A. A. MacLeod, a Communist member of the Ontario legislature in the 1940s. While MacLaine was still a child, Ira Beaty moved his family from Richmond to Norfolk, and then to Arlington and Waverly, then back to Arlington eventually taking a position at Arlington's Thomas Jefferson Junior High School in 1945. MacLaine played baseball on an all-boys team, holding the record for most home runs, which earned her the nickname "Powerhouse". During the 1950s, the family resided in the Dominion Hills section of Arlington.

As a toddler, she had weak ankles and fell over with the slightest misstep, so her mother decided to enroll her in ballet class at the Washington School of Ballet at the age of three. This was the beginning of her interest in performing. Strongly motivated by ballet, she never missed a class. In classical romantic pieces like Romeo and Juliet and The Sleeping Beauty, she always played the boys' roles due to being the tallest in the group and the absence of males in the class. Eventually, she had a substantial female role as the fairy godmother in Cinderella; while warming up backstage, she broke her ankle, but then tightened the ribbons on her toe shoes and proceeded to dance the role all the way through before calling for an ambulance. Ultimately she decided against making a career of professional ballet because she had grown too tall and was unable to perfect her technique. She explained that she didn't have the ideal body type, lacking the requisite "beautifully constructed feet" of high arches, high insteps and a flexible ankle. Also slowly realizing ballet's propensity to be all-consuming, and ultimately limiting, she moved on to other forms of dancing, acting and musical theater.

She attended Washington-Lee High School, where she was on the cheerleading squad and acted in school theatrical productions.

Career
The summer before her senior year of high school, MacLaine went to New York City to try acting on Broadway, having minor success in the chorus of Oklahoma!   After she graduated, she returned and was in the dancing ensemble of the Broadway production of Me and Juliet (1953–1954). Afterwards she became an understudy to actress Carol Haney in The Pajama Game; in May 1954 Haney injured her ankle during a Wednesday matinee, and MacLaine replaced her. A few months later, with Haney still injured, film producer Hal B. Wallis saw MacLaine's performance, and signed her to work for Paramount Pictures.

1955–1979

MacLaine made her film debut in Alfred Hitchcock's The Trouble with Harry (1955), for which she won the Golden Globe Award for New Star of the Year – Actress. This led to MacLaine quickly rising to stardom during the later years of the Golden Age of Hollywood. The Trouble with Harry was quickly followed by her role in the Martin and Lewis film Artists and Models (also 1955). Soon afterwards, she had a role in Around the World in 80 Days (1956) which won the Academy Award for Best Picture. This was followed by Hot Spell and a leading role in Some Came Running (both 1958); for the latter film, she gained her first Academy Award nomination and a Golden Globe nomination.

In 1960, MacLaine starred in Billy Wilder's The Apartment (1960), alongside Jack Lemmon. The film, set in the Upper West Side, revolves around C.C. Baxter (Lemmon), an insurance clerk who allows his co-workers to use his apartment for their extramarital affairs.  Baxter is attracted to the insurance company's elevator operator, Fran Kubelik (MacLaine), who is already having an affair with Baxter's boss (Fred MacMurray). A blend of romantic drama and comedy, the film received 10 Academy Award nominations, winning Best Picture, Best Director, Best Original Screenplay, Best Art Direction (Black and White) and Best Film Editing. Despite being the odds-on favorite, MacLaine failed to win the Best Actress award. She later said, "I thought I would win for The Apartment, but then, Elizabeth Taylor [who won] had a tracheotomy." The film, which Roger Ebert included in his 2001 Great Movies list, has become MacLaine's signature role. Charlize Theron, speaking at the 89th Academy Awards, praised MacLaine's performance as "raw and real and funny", and as making "this black and white movie feel like it's in color".

She starred in The Children's Hour (1961), also starring Audrey Hepburn and James Garner, based on the play by Lillian Hellman, and directed by William Wyler. She was again nominated, this time for Irma la Douce (1963), which reunited her with Wilder and Lemmon. 

MacLaine devoted several pages in her first memoir, Don't Fall Off the Mountain (1970), to a 1963 incident in which she had marched into the Los Angeles office of The Hollywood Reporter and punched columnist Mike Connolly in the mouth. She was angered by what he had said in his column about her ongoing contractual dispute with producer Hal Wallis, who had introduced her to the movie industry in 1954 and whom she eventually sued successfully for violating the terms of their contract.  The incident with Connolly garnered a headline on the cover of the New York Post on June 11, 1963. The full story appeared on page 5 under the headline “Shirley Delivers A Punchy Line” with the byline Bernard Lefkowitz.

At the peak of her success, she replaced Marilyn Monroe in two projects in which Monroe had planned, at the end of her life, to star: Irma la Douce (1963) and What a Way to Go! (1964).  MacLaine worked with Michael Caine in Gambit (1966).

 
In 1969, MacLaine starred in the film version of the musical Sweet Charity, directed by Bob Fosse, and based on the script for Fellini's Nights of Cabiria released a decade earlier. Gwen Verdon, who originated the role onstage, had hoped to play Charity in the film version, however MacLaine won the role due to her name being more well known to audiences at the time. Verdon signed on as assistant choreographer, helping teach MacLaine the dances and leading the camera through some of the more intricate routines. MacLaine received a Golden Globe Award for Best Actress – Motion Picture Comedy or Musical nomination. The film, while not a financial success, launched Fosse's film directing career with his next film being Cabaret (1972).

Don Siegel, MacLaine's director on Two Mules for Sister Sara (1970), said of her: "It's hard to feel any great warmth to her. She's too unfeminine, and has too much balls. She's very, very hard." 

MacLaine was cast as a photojournalist in a short-lived television sitcom, Shirley's World (1971–1972), co-produced by Sheldon Leonard and ITC and shot in the United Kingdom. Her documentary film The Other Half of the Sky: A China Memoir (1975), co-directed with Claudia Weill, concentrates on the experiences of women in China. It was nominated for the year's Documentary Feature Oscar. In 1976 MacLaine appeared in a series of concerts at the London Palladium and New York's Palace Theatre. The latter of these was released as the acclaimed live album Shirley MacLaine Live at the Palace. Co-starring with Anne Bancroft in The Turning Point (1977), MacLaine portrayed a retired ballerina much like herself; she was nominated for an Oscar as the Best Actress in a Leading Role. In 1978, she was awarded the Women in Film Crystal Award for outstanding women who, through their endurance and the excellence of their work, have helped to expand the role of women within the entertainment industry.

In 1979 she starred alongside Peter Sellers in Hal Ashby's satirical film Being There. The film revolves around Chance (Sellers), a simpleminded, sheltered gardener, who becomes an unlikely trusted advisor to a powerful businessman and an insider in Washington politics, after his wealthy old boss dies. The film received widespread acclaim with Roger Ebert writing that he admired the film "for having the guts to take this totally weird concept and push it to its ultimate comic conclusion". Despite not receiving an Academy Award nomination, MacLaine received a British Academy Film Award, and Golden Globe Award nomination for her performance.

1980–present

In 1980, MacLaine starred in A Change of Seasons (1980) alongside Anthony Hopkins. The two famously did not get along with each other and the film was not a success due to what critics faulted as the screenplay. MacLaine however did receive positive notices from critics. Vincent Canby wrote in his The New York Times review that the film "exhibits no sense of humor and no appreciation for the ridiculous … the screenplay [is] often dreadful … the only appealing performance is Miss MacLaine's, and she's too good to be true. A Change of Seasons does prove one thing, though. A farce about characters who've been freed of their conventional obligations quickly becomes aimless."

In 1983, MacLaine starred in James L. Brooks's comedy-drama film Terms of Endearment (1983) playing Debra Winger's mother.
The film focuses on the strained relationship between mother and daughter over 30 years. The film also starred Jack Nicholson, Jeff Daniels, and John Lithgow. The film was a major critical and commercial success, grossing $108.4 million at the domestic box office and becoming the second-highest-grossing film of 1983. The film received a leading eleven nominations at the  56th Academy Awards, and won five including Best Picture. MacLaine earned her first Academy Award for her performance.
 
MacLaine has continued to star in major films, such as the family southern drama Steel Magnolias (1989) directed by Herbert Ross and also starring with Sally Field, Julia Roberts, and Dolly Parton. The film focuses around a bond that a group of women share in a small-town Southern community, and how they cope with the death of a loved one. The film was a box office success earning $96.8 million off a budget of $15 million. MacLaine received a British Academy Film Award for her performance. She starred in Mike Nichols' film Postcards from the Edge (1990), with Meryl Streep, playing a fictionalized version of Debbie Reynolds from a screenplay by Reynolds's daughter, Carrie Fisher. Fisher wrote the screenplay based on her book. MacLaine received another Golden Globe Award nomination for her performance.

MacLaine continued to act in films such as Used People (1992), with Jessica Tandy and Kathy Bates; Guarding Tess (1994), with Nicolas Cage; Mrs. Winterbourne (1996), with Ricki Lake and Brendan Fraser; The Evening Star (1996); Rumor Has It…(2005) with Kevin Costner and Jennifer Aniston; In Her Shoes (also 2005), with Cameron Diaz and Toni Collette; and Closing the Ring (2007), directed by Richard Attenborough and starring Christopher Plummer. She would later reunite with Plummer in the 2014 comedy film Elsa & Fred directed by Michael Radford. In 2000, she made her feature-film directorial debut, and starred in Bruno, which was released to video as The Dress Code. In 2011 MacLaine starred in Richard Linklater's dark comedy film Bernie alongside Jack Black, and Matthew McConaughey.

MacLaine has also appeared in numerous television projects, including an autobiographical miniseries based upon the book Out on a Limb; The Salem Witch Trials; These Old Broads written by Carrie Fisher and co-starring Elizabeth Taylor, Debbie Reynolds, and Joan Collins. In 2009, she starred in Coco Before Chanel, a Lifetime production based on the life of Coco Chanel which earned her Primetime Emmy Award, and Golden Globe Award nominations. She appeared in the third and fourth seasons of the acclaimed British drama Downton Abbey as Martha Levinson, mother to Cora, Countess of Grantham (played by Elizabeth McGovern), and Harold Levinson (played by Paul Giamatti) in 2012–2013.

In 2016, MacLaine starred in Wild Oats with Jessica Lange. She starred in the live-action family film The Little Mermaid, based on the Hans Christian Andersen fairytale, in 2018.  In 2022, she returned to the small screen in the series Only Murders in the Building.

Personal life
MacLaine was married to businessman Steve Parker from 1954 until their divorce in 1982; they have a daughter, Sachi. Their daughter has said that, when she was in her late twenties, her mother revealed her belief that an astronaut named Paul was Sachi's real father, not Steve Parker.

In April 2011, while promoting her new book, I'm Over All That, she revealed to Oprah Winfrey that she had had an open relationship with her husband. MacLaine also told Winfrey that she often fell for the leading men she worked with, the exceptions being Jack Lemmon (The Apartment, Irma la Douce) and Jack Nicholson (Terms of Endearment). MacLaine also had long-running affairs with Lord Mountbatten, whom she met in the 1960s, and Australian politician and two-time Liberal leader Andrew Peacock.

MacLaine has also gotten into feuds with such notable co-stars as Anthony Hopkins (A Change of Seasons), who said that "she was the most obnoxious actress I have ever worked with," and Debra Winger (Terms of Endearment).

MacLaine has claimed that, in a previous life, in Atlantis, she was the brother of a 35,000-year-old spirit named Ramtha, channeled by American mystic teacher and author J. Z. Knight.

She has a strong interest in spirituality and metaphysics, which are the central themes of some of her best-selling books, including Out on a Limb and Dancing in the Light. Her spiritual explorations include walking the Way of St. James, working with Chris Griscom, and practicing Transcendental Meditation.

The topic of New Age spirituality has also found its way into several of her films. In Albert Brooks's romantic comedy Defending Your Life (1991), the recently deceased lead characters, played by Brooks and Meryl Streep, are astonished to find MacLaine introducing their past lives in the "Past Lives Pavilion"; in Postcards from the Edge (1990), MacLaine sings a version of "I'm Still Here", with lyrics customized for her by composer Stephen Sondheim (for example, one line in the lyrics was changed to "I'm feeling transcendental – am I here?"); and in the 2001 television movie These Old Broads, MacLaine's character is a devotee of New Age spirituality.

She has an interest in UFOs, and gave numerous interviews on CNN, NBC and Fox news channels on the subject during 2007–08. In her book Sage-ing While Age-ing (2007), she described having alien encounters and witnessing a Washington, D.C. UFO incident in the 1950s. On an episode of The Oprah Winfrey Show in April 2011, MacLaine stated that she and her neighbor had observed numerous UFOs at her New Mexico ranch for extended periods of time.

Along with her brother, Warren Beatty, MacLaine used her celebrity status in instrumental roles as a fundraiser and organizer for George McGovern's campaign for president in 1972. That year, she wrote the book McGovern: The Man and His Beliefs. She appeared at her brother's concerts Four for McGovern and Together for McGovern, and she joined with Sid Bernstein to produce the woman-focused Star-Spangled Women for McGovern–Shriver variety show at Madison Square Garden. So much of her time was spent away from acting in 1972 that her talent agent threatened to quit; she turned down film projects and spent $250,000 of her own money on political activism, . 

MacLaine is godmother to journalist Jackie Kucinich, daughter of former Democratic U.S. Representative Dennis Kucinich.

On February 7, 2013, Penguin Group USA published Sachi Parker's autobiography Lucky Me: My Life With – and Without – My Mom, Shirley MacLaine. MacLaine has called the book "virtually all fiction".

In 2015, she sparked criticism for her comments on Jews, Christians, and Stephen Hawking. In particular, she claimed that victims of the Holocaust were experiencing the results of their own karma, and suggested that Hawking had subconsciously caused himself to develop ALS in order to focus better on physics.

Lawsuits
In 1959, MacLaine sued Hal Wallis over a contractual dispute; that lawsuit has been credited with ending the old-style studio star system of actor management.

In 1966, MacLaine sued Twentieth Century-Fox for breach of contract when the studio reneged on its agreement to star MacLaine in a film version of the Broadway musical Bloomer Girl based on the life of Amelia Bloomer, a mid-nineteenth century feminist, suffragist, and abolitionist, that was to be filmed in Hollywood. Instead, Fox gave MacLaine one week to accept their offer of the female dramatic lead in the Western Big Country, Big Man to be filmed in Australia. The case was decided in MacLaine's favor, and affirmed on appeal by the California Supreme Court in 1970; the case is discussed in many law-school textbooks as an example of employment-contract law.

Filmography

Film

Television

Theatre

Honors and legacy

In 1960 she received a star on the Hollywood Walk of Fame at 1617 Vine Street.
In 1999 was awarded the Honorary Golden Bear at the 49th Berlin International Film Festival.
In 2011, the government of France made her a Chevalier de la Legion d'honneur.
In 2013, MacLaine was awarded the Kennedy Center Honors for lifetime contributions to American culture through the performing arts. 
In 2017 MacLaine was featured in a segment in which Charlize Theron praised her for her work in The Apartment during the 2017 Academy Awards telecast. She later presented the Academy Award for Best International Film of the year alongside Theron.
In 2019 she won the Movies for Grown Ups with AARP the Magazine's Life Time Achievement Award.

Bibliography 

 
 
 
 
 
 
 
 
 
  (Published in Europe as)

References

Further reading
 Erens, Patricia (1978). The Films of Shirley MacLaine. South Brunswick: A. S. Barnes. .

External links

 
 
 
 
 
 
 Shirley MacLaine interviewed by Ginny Dougary (2005)
 Shirley MacLaine interview on BBC Radio 4 Desert Island Discs, November 11, 1983
 

1934 births
Living people
20th-century American actresses
20th-century American biographers
20th-century American singers
20th-century American women singers
20th-century American women writers
21st-century American actresses
21st-century American biographers
21st-century American women singers
21st-century American singers
21st-century American women writers
Actresses from Richmond, Virginia
American dancers
American female dancers
American film actresses
American memoirists
American musical theatre actresses
American people of Canadian descent
American spiritual writers
American television actresses
American women comedians
American women memoirists
American women biographers
AFI Life Achievement Award recipients
Baptists from New York (state)
Baptists from Virginia
Best Actress Academy Award winners
Best Drama Actress Golden Globe (film) winners
Best Foreign Actress BAFTA Award winners
Best Musical or Comedy Actress Golden Globe (film) winners
Cecil B. DeMille Award Golden Globe winners
Dancers from New York (state)
David di Donatello winners
Honorary Golden Bear recipients
New Age writers
New Star of the Year (Actress) Golden Globe winners
Kennedy Center honorees
Paramount Pictures contract players
People from Arlington County, Virginia
Primetime Emmy Award winners
Silver Bear for Best Actress winners
Singers from Virginia
Volpi Cup for Best Actress winners
Writers from Richmond, Virginia
Washington-Liberty High School alumni